La Ragazza di Trieste, internationally released as The Girl from Trieste, is a 1982 Italian romance-drama film directed by Pasquale Festa Campanile and based on a novel of the same name written by the director. It recounts a doomed love affair between a conventional man and a mentally unstable girl with suicidal tendencies.

Plot

Dino, a comic book illustrator, has a house by the sea near Trieste. While he is sitting drawing at the beach café one morning, he sees the rescue of a beautiful young woman who has tried to drown herself. He offers her a towel to cover herself, which she returns next day and thanks him by making love before she disappears. Each struck by the other, they meet at intervals but apart from her name, which is Nicole, he is only given evasions and fantasies. In addition to her unpredictable mood changes, he is also perturbed by her tendency to attract male attention by sexual exhibitionism.

In fact she is a patient in an open psychiatric hospital and in no state for a stable relationship, let alone marriage. When Dino accidentally learns this, he goes off on a trip to Venice with his ex-wife. On his return Nicole is worse, but his continued love for her leads him to suggest that she lives with him. He takes her for a trip to Paris, where her facade of normality begins to crack. Back at his house she becomes impossible to live with, losing her grip on reality and cutting off all her hair. While he is sitting drawing at the beach café one morning, he sees her walking into the sea to drown herself.

Cast
 Ben Gazzara as Dino Romani
 Ornella Muti as Nicole
 Mimsy Farmer as Valeria
 Andréa Ferréol as Stefanutti
 Jean-Claude Brialy as Professor Martin
 William Berger as Charly
  Consuelo Ferrara as Francesca
 Romano Puppo as Toni

See also 
 List of Italian films of 1982

References

Further reading
 Pasquale Festa Campanile. La ragazza di Trieste. Bompiani, 1982.

External links
 

1982 films
Italian drama films
1980s Italian-language films
Films about fictional painters
Films directed by Pasquale Festa Campanile
Films based on Italian novels
Films scored by Riz Ortolani
1950s Italian films
1980s Italian films